Hydroiodic acid (or hydriodic acid) is an aqueous solution of hydrogen iodide (HI). It is a strong acid, one that is ionized completely in an aqueous solution.  It is colorless.  Concentrated solutions are usually 48% to 57% HI.

Reactions
Hydroiodic acid reacts with oxygen in air to give iodine:
4 HI + O2 → 2  + 2 I2

Like other hydrogen halides, hydroiodic acid adds to alkenes to give alkyl iodides. It can also be used as a reducing agent, for example in the reduction of aromatic nitro compounds to anilines.

Cativa process
The Cativa process is a major end use of hydroiodic acid, which serves as a co-catalyst for the production of acetic acid by the carbonylation of methanol.

Illicit uses
Hydroiodic acid is listed as a U.S. Federal DEA List I Chemical, owing to its use as a reducing agent related to the production of methamphetamine from ephedrine or pseudoephedrine (recovered from nasal decongestant pills).

References

External links 
 International Chemical Safety Card 1326
 European Chemicals Bureau

Iodides
Acids
Nonmetal halides
Reducing agents

nl:Waterstofjodide
pl:Kwas jodowodorowy